Terry Wolverton (born 1954) is an American novelist, memoirist, poet, and editor. Her book Insurgent Muse: Life and Art at the Woman's Building, a memoir published in 2002 by City Lights Books, was named one of the "Best Books of 2002" by the Los Angeles Times, and was the winner of the 2003 Publishing Triangle Judy Grahn Award, and a finalist for the Lambda Literary Award. Her novel-in-poems Embers was a finalist for the PEN USA Litfest Poetry Award and the Lambda Literary Award.

Early years 
Born August 23, 1954, in Cocoa Beach, Florida, Wolverton grew up in Detroit, Michigan.  
Her grandmother, Elsba Mae Miller, a former English teacher, would often read and recite poetry to her, and Wolverton credits this for inspiring her love of language.  Even as a child Wolverton was interested in the arts, especially writing, music, and drama; she graduated from the Performing Arts curriculum of Cass Technical High School in 1972.

Education 
Wolverton graduated from the Performing Arts curriculum of Cass Technical High School in 1972, after which she attended the University of Detroit as a student in its Bachelor of Fine Arts Theatre program.  In 1973, she transferred to the University of Toronto, majoring in Theatre, Psychology, and Women's Studies. In 1975, Wolverton participated in Sagaris, an independent institute for the study of feminist political theory. She ultimately received a Bachelor of Philosophy degree in Creative Writing and Theater from Thomas Jefferson College, an experimental school based at Grand Valley State Colleges in Western Michigan, where she participated in its feminist Women, World, and Wonder program.

Wolverton also received a certificate from the Feminist Studio Workshop in Los Angeles and is a certified Kundalini yoga and meditation instructor.

Career 
Wolverton moved to Los Angeles in 1976, enrolling in the Feminist Studio Workshop at the Woman's Building.  She spent the next thirteen years at the Woman's Building where, in addition to writing and performing, she was also instrumental in the Lesbian Art Project, the Incest Awareness Project, the Great American Lesbian Art Show (GALAS), a year-long performance project called "An Oral Herstory of Lesbianism", and a White Women's Anti-Racism Consciousness-Raising Group.  From 1987 to 1988, she served as the nonprofit organization's Executive Director.

Wolverton has taught performance skills and creative writing since 1977.  In 1986, she developed the Visions and Revisions Writing Program at Connexxus Women's Center/Centro de Mujeres.  In 1988, she launched the Perspectives Writing Program at the Los Angeles Gay and Lesbian Center, where she taught until 1997. One notable writer that attended these workshops was Gil Cuadros, a Mexican American poet who was diagnosed with AIDS in 1987. Cuadros started attending her writing workshops for people with HIV. As a result of his participation, Cuadros published his collection of poetry and fiction, City of God(1994).

In 1997, Wolverton founded Writers at Work, a creative writing center where she continues to teach fiction, creative nonfiction, and poetry, and to provide creative consultations to writers.

In 2007, Wolverton co-founded The Future of Publishing Think Tank, which convened writers, publishers, booksellers and publicists to consider new models for reaching readers. The Think Tank held discussions, offered workshops, conducted reader surveys, and compiled an online directory of literary resources in Los Angeles County.

The same year, she became an affiliate faculty member in the Master of Fine Arts writing program at Antioch University, where she currently works.

Awards

Bibliography 
Author
Black Slip, Clothespin Fever Press, 1992,  (poetry) 
Bailey's Beads, Faber & Faber, 1996,  (novel)
Mystery Bruise, Red Hen Press, 1999,  (poetry)
Insurgent Muse: Life and Art at the Woman's Building, City Lights Books, 2002.  (memoir) 
Terry Wolverton Greatest Hits., Pudding House Publications, 2002,  (poetry) 
Embers: A Novel in Poems, Red Hen Press, 2003, 
Shadow and Praise, Main Street Rag Publishing Company, 2007,  (poetry)
The Labrys Reunion, Spinters Ink, 2009,  (novel)
Breath and other stories,  Silverton Books, 2012, (novel)
Stealing Angel, Spinsters Ink, 2009, (novel)
Wounded World: lyric essays about our spiritual disquiet, with photographs by Yvonne M. Estrada, Create Space Independent Publishing, 2013  (essays)
Ruin Porn, Finishing Line Press, 2017,  (poetry)
Blue Hunger, Finishing Line Press, 2018,  (poetry)

Editor
Blood Whispers: L. A. Writers on AIDS, Silverton Books (vol 1, 1991, ; vol 2, 1994)
Catena: poem series by member of the Women's Poetry Project, Silverton Books, 2003,  (poetry)
Mischief, Caprice, and Other Poetic Strategies, Red Hen Press, 2004, (poetry) 
Bird Float, Tree Song: disarticulated poems by Los Angeles poets, Silverton Books, 2017,  (poetry)

Edited with Benjamin Weissman
Harbinger, Los Angeles Festival and Beyond Baroque, 1991,  (poetry and fiction)

Edited with Robert Drake
Indivisible: New Short Fiction by West Coast Gay and Lesbian Writers Plume Books 1991, 
Hers: Brilliant New Fiction by Lesbian Writers Faber & Faber Incorporated, 1995, 
His: Brilliant New Fiction by Gay Writers Faber & Faber Incorporated, 1995, 
Hers 2 and His 2 Faber & Faber, Incorporated, 1997,  
Hers 3 and His 3 Faber & Faber, Incorporated, 1999,  
Circa 2000: Gay Fiction at the Millennium Alyson Books, 2000, 
Circa 2000: Lesbian Fiction at the Millennium Alyson Books 2000, 

Edited with Sondra Hale
From Site to Vision: the Woman's Building in Contemporary Culture, Otis College of Art and Design, 2011, 

Scripts and Performance Art Texts
Embers, theatrical adaptation of novel-in-poems, concert reading, Grand Performances, Los Angeles, CA. 2011
Embers, theatrical adaptation of novel-in-poems, workshop production, Los Angeles Central Library, 2009
"Cover Story," collaboration with choreographer Heidi Duckler/Collage Dance Theater, 2002
"After Eden," collaboration with choreographer Heidi Duckler/Collage Dance Theater, 2001
"Under Eden," collaboration with choreographer Heidi Duckler/Collage Dance Theater, 2001
"Sub Versions," collaboration with choreographer Heidi Duckler/Collage Dance Theater, 2000
Treatment for Rapunzel, animated feature film, Walt Disney Company, 1997
 Poetry segments for Destination Anywhere, a short film/music video directed by Mark Pellington, starring Jon Bon Jovi and Demi Moore, Mercury Records, First broadcast on MTV, June 17, 1997.
Treatment for The Snow Queen, animated feature film, Walt Disney Company, 1993.
Treatment for Anna, animated feature film, Walt Disney Company. 1993.
Green, full-length feature film, not produced. 1990.
"Meditations," text for "Broken," dance performance choreographed by Rose Polsky, premiered Los Angeles Theater Center. 1990.
A Merry Little Christmas, three-act play, staged reading produced at Celebration Theater. 1987.
dis-a-buse: to free from a misconception or delusion, performance text co-written with Catherine Stifter, produced at the Woman's Building. 1986.
Familiar, performance text produced at the Social & Public Art Resource Center, 1984.
 Me and My Shadow, performance text, produced at ABC No Rio; Sushi Gallery, UCLA, the Woman's Building. 1984.
 Medium: Memory/Muse, performance text, produced at Long Beach Museum of Art. 1983.
"Ya Got Class, Real Class," performance text co-written with Vicki Stolsen, produced at Los Angeles Contemporary Exhibitions, 1980.
"In Silence Secrets Turn to Lies/Secrets Shared Become Sacred Truth," performance text, produced at the Woman's Building as part of the Incest Awareness Project. 1979.

References

External links 
 Terry Wolverton, biographical entry, in glbtq: an encyclopedia of gay, lesbian, bisexual, & queer culture
 Talking with Terry Wolverton (1996 interview)
 Technodyke Terry Wolverton interview
 Susan Silton, "Terry Wolverton" in Contemporary Lesbian Writers of the United States: A Bio-Bibliographical Critical Sourcebook, edited by Sandra Pollack and Denise D. Knight (Westport, Connecticut: Greenwood Publishers, 1993)
 Dead Air Book Review: The Labrys Reunion by Terry Wolverton
 The Woman's Building, a Brief History, Feminist Studio Workshop External Link
 Pacifica Radio Archives, Sagaris and the August 7th Survival Community

1954 births
Living people
American feminist writers
American lesbian writers
American performance artists
American women performance artists
Lambda Literary Award winners
American LGBT poets
American women poets
Lesbian memoirists
21st-century American women writers
Antioch University faculty
Grand Valley State University alumni